West Bloomfield Township, officially the Charter Township of West Bloomfield, is a charter township in Oakland County in the U.S. state of Michigan, within the Detroit metropolitan area. It is one of the most expensive places to live in Oakland County. As of the 2020 census, the township had a population of 65,888.

Communities
Westacres is an unincorporated community in the township at Keith and Commerce Roads ( Elevation: 925 ft./282 m.).

Geography
West Bloomfield is sometimes referred to by its residents as the "lake township of Oakland County", due to it being heavily dotted with small and medium-sized lakes. Cass Lake, the largest lake in the county, is in part of West Bloomfield, and Pine Lake, which has a private country club on its shore, is only a few miles away from Cass and lies completely within West Bloomfield. In addition, directly west of Pine Lake is Orchard Lake, which also has a private country club on its shore.  Orchard Lake is surrounded by the city of Orchard Lake Village. Several smaller lakes are scattered around these larger ones.

Orchard Lake Road runs north–south through the middle of the township and is the main artery of West Bloomfield's economy along with West Maple Road (15 Mile Rd.), flanked on each side by long strip malls and shopping complexes. There are many high-end boutique stores and expensive restaurants to visit. Most of the township's population growth has occurred since the 1960s, as many residents moved there from the inner ring Detroit suburbs. The communities of West Bloomfield, Orchard Lake Village, Keego Harbor, and Sylvan Lake make up what is known as Greater West Bloomfield.

Education

The school districts that serve the township are the West Bloomfield School District, Waterford School District, Farmington Public Schools, Birmingham City School District, Pontiac School District, Walled Lake School District, and the Bloomfield Hills School District.

West Bloomfield High School and the Frankel Jewish Academy of Metropolitan Detroit are in West Bloomfield proper, and St. Mary's Preparatory is in Orchard Lake Village.

Catholic schools are under the Roman Catholic Archdiocese of Detroit. St. William Catholic Church, which includes portions of West Bloomfield in its service area, operates St. William Catholic School, a K-8 school in Walled Lake.

The West Bloomfield Township Public Library serves West Bloomfield. In 1999 this library and the Awaji City Library in Awaji, Hyogo, Japan were paired as sister institutions.

Religion
West Bloomfield is home to the largest Jewish population in Michigan. Catholic Churches are under the Archdiocese of Detroit. Prince of Peace Church is in West Bloomfield. St. William Church in Walled Lake includes portions of West Bloomfield in its service area.

Demographics
As of the census of 2010, there were 64,690 people, 24,411 households, and 18,040 families living in the township. The racial makeup of the township was 77.6% White, 11.4% Black or African American, 0.1% Native American, 8.4% Asian, 0.02% Pacific Islander, 0.4% from other races, and 2.0% from two or more races. Hispanic or Latino of any race were 1.60% of the population.

As of the census of 2000, there were 64,860 people, 23,414 households, and 18,192 families living in the township. The racial makeup of the township was 84.25% White, 5.18% Black or African American, 0.12% Native American, 7.81% Asian, 0.02% Pacific Islander, 0.38% from other races, and 2.25% from two or more races. Hispanic or Latino of any race were 1.40% of the population.

There were 23,414 households, out of which 37.0% had children under the age of 18 living with them, 69.5% were married couples living together, 5.8% had a female householder with no husband present, and 22.3% were non-families. 19.4% of all households were made up of individuals, and 7.5% had someone living alone who was 65 years of age or older.  The average household size was 2.74 and the average family size was 3.17.

In the township, 26.4% of the population was under the age of 18, 5.2% was between 18 to 24, 27.1% from 25 to 44, 27.9% from 45 to 64, and 13.4% were 65 years of age or older. The median age was 40 years. For every 100 females, there were 96.8 males.  For every 100 females age 18 and over, there were 92.9 males.

According to a 2007 estimate, the median income for a household in the township was $98,832, and the median income for a family was $113,191. Males had a median income of $74,557 versus $45,339 for females. The per capita income for the township was $44,885. About 1.6% of families and 2.7% of the population were below the poverty line, including 3.0% of those under age 18 and 2.6% of those age 65 and over.

Ethnic groups

West Bloomfield has a large Jewish population. It is home to the Jewish Community Center of Metropolitan Detroit, the Frankel Jewish Academy, a Jewish community high school, and the museum of the Jewish Historical Society of Michigan.

West Bloomfield also has a large Chaldo-Assyrian population. In 2004 the Chaldean Cultural Center, the largest of its kind in the United States, was eatablished in the township.

As of April 2013, West Bloomfield had the third largest Japanese national population in the state of Michigan, at 1,047.

Notable people 
 Rucka Rucka Ali,  rapper, radio personality, singer, comedian, and satirist most noted for his song parodies on YouTube
 Justin Bartha, actor, most notable for The Hangover Trilogy and the National Treasure series
 Jack Berry, sports journalist for The Detroit News and the Detroit Free Press
 Melrose Bickerstaff, model, appeared on America's Next Top Model
 Meryl Davis, Olympic ice dancer who won the gold medal at the 2014 Winter Olympics in Sochi, Russia
 Pamela Eldred, Miss America 1970
 Dan Gheesling, winner of Big Brother 10 and runner-up of Big Brother 14
 Joe Ginsberg , former baseball catcher for the Detroit Tigers
 Adam Grant, psychologist
 Brandon T. Jackson, actor, appears in Tropic Thunder, and Percy Jackson
 Kyle Mack, Olympic snowboarder, who won silver medal in Men's Big Air at Pyeongchang 2018 Winter Olympics
 Dana Nessel, Michigan Attorney General
 Adetokunbo Ogundeji, outside linebacker for the Atlanta Falcons
 Jesse Palter, modern jazz singer
 Karen Clark Sheard, gospel singer
 Bruce Ableson, social media pioneer

See also 
1976 West Bloomfield Tornado

References

External links

 Charter Township of West Bloomfield
 West Bloomfield Township Public Library

Townships in Oakland County, Michigan
Charter townships in Michigan
Metro Detroit
Populated places established in 1833
1833 establishments in Michigan Territory
Former census-designated places in Michigan
Assyrian-American culture in Michigan
Jews and Judaism in Michigan